Cleveland Township is a township in 
Lyon County, Iowa.

References

Lyon County, Iowa
Townships in Iowa